Chicamán is a municipality in the Guatemalan department of El Quiché.

Tourists may visit the Canyon El Barbudo and the Quatro Chorros waterfalls.

References

External links
 

Municipalities of the Quiché Department